The 2017 season was Kedah FA's 9th season in the Malaysia Super League since its inception in 2004. They will also eligible to compete in FA Cup and Malaysia Cup.

Season overview

Pre-season
On 24 November 2016, Azmeer Yusof through his personal Facebook account have confirmed will be with Kuala Lumpur for the 2017 season although Kedah offered him a new contract for another season.

On 28 November 2016, the contract of Liridon Krasniqi was renewed for another two years and is set to expire in the end of 2018 season.

On 1 December 2016, Mohd Fitri Omar was signed from Penang FA and Muhammad Akram Mahinan was signed from Johor Darul Ta'zim Both signed one-year deals with the club.

On 14 December 2016, Fakri Saarani re-joined the club for another season after the end of loan from Felda United.

January
On 3 January 2017, Ken Ilsø was signed from Home United for a one-year deal with Kedah

On 13 January 2017, Zachary Michael Anderson was announced the last foreign players signed with Kedah

On 20 January 2017, Kedah started the season with a 1–1 draw at Johor Darul Ta'zim with a goal from Baddrol Bakhtiar and winning the Charity Shield for the third time on penalty shootout. Their last Charity Shield victory was in 1991 and 1994.

On 27 January 2017, at their home debut of the season, Baddrol, Sandro and Syazwan gave Kedah a narrow 3–2 victory against Sarawak.

February
On 4 February 2017, Kedah drew 1–1 at FELDA United with a 1st goal of the season from Ken Ilsø.

On 11 February 2017, Kedah wrested the Super League top spot away from Pahang, after they defeated the Elephants 4–1 at the Darul Aman Stadium on Saturday. Their goals were scored by Baddrol and Farhan, as well as Ken Ilsø's double.

On 14 February 2017, Kedah ease through to 3rd round of FA Cup, defeating Kuala Lumpur 4–2 with a two-goal from Farhan, a goal from Liridon and an own goal.

On 18 February 2017, Baddrol penalty kick gave Kedah the late 0–1 win at Kelantan.

On 25 February 2017, Kedah defeated Penang 3–1 in the first Northern derby, with a goal from Fitri, Syafiq and Liridon.

March
On 1 March 2017, Kedah drew at Selangor 1–1 with a free kick goal from Sandro.

On 4 March 2017, two goals from Ken Ilsø and Sandro secured Kedah a 4–0 win over Melaka United.

On 11 March 2017, Kedah defeated Perak TBG 2–0 in the round of 16 match in the FA Cup, with a goals from Anderson and Ken Ilsø. Kedah moved to the next round.

April
On 1 April 2017, the FA Cup got underway with a 6–1 win over PKNP, Kedah gave PKNP no chance in the first leg FA Cup quarter-final match, with doubles from Ken Ilsø, a free-kick from Fitri, a penalty from Liridon, a wonder strike from Syafiq and another own goal.

On 8 April 2017, a goal from Anderson was not enough in a 1–1 draw against PKNS.

On 15 April 2017, Kedah lost their first game in this years league campaign at T–Team 5–0. The biggest defeat for this season so far.

On 21 April 2017, Kedah lost their second straight game with a 1–0 loss at PKNP in the second leg of the FA Cup quarter-final, but still made it through to the semi-final with (6–2 win on aggregate).

On 26 April 2017, a wonderful direct free kick goal from Baddrol gave Kedah a 1–1 draw against Perak TBG.

On 30 April 2017, youngster Farhan emerged Kedah's hero in their first leg FA Cup semi-final match against Terengganu, when he scored the only goal of the match. Kedah won 1–0

May
On 9 May 2017, Kedah drew 4–4 at PKNS, with two goals from Syafiq, a goal from Ken Ilsø and penalty from Sandro.

On 13 May 2017, Kedah are through to their third cup final match in three years, after they defeated Terengganu 3–0 in their second leg FA Cup semi-final match, to take the tie 4–0 on aggregate. All three imports scored the goals Liridon, Ken Ilsø and Sandro.

On 20 May 2017, Kedah won the 2017 Malaysia FA Cup, defeating Pahang 3–2 with a two-goal from Baddrol and a goal from Ken Ilsø.

On 24 May 2017, Ken Ilsø scored his first hat-trick to help Kedah get a 3–0 home win against T–Team.

July
On 1 July 2017, Kedah suffered their first home defeat of the season in a thrilling 2–3 loss to Perak TBG. Sandro and Liridon notched the goals for the Red Eagles but they couldn't find enough overturn the result.

On 4 July 2017, 2016 Malaysia Cup champions Kedah recovered from their weekend defeat in the Super League to record a 2–0 win over Melaka United at the Darul Aman Stadium. Sandro gave Kedah the lead in the 29th minute through his volley from outside the Mousedeers' penalty box, and Baddrol doubled their lead in the 64th minute.

On 7 July 2017, Defending champions Kedah maintained their 100% record in the cup, when they trashed UiTM FC 5–0. In the match which was held at the UiTM Stadium, Syafiq opened the scoring as early as the third minute, before Liridon (44'), Ken Ilsø (80'), Sandro (90') and a Faiz Bandong own goal (90+3') compounded the university boys' misery.

On 11 July 2017, Kedah edged Melaka United – coming back twice to not only draw level but to eventually win the game 4–2. It was 2–2 at half time after Marco Simic scored twice but found his side pegged back each time by Baddrol. Akram scored a rare goal to put Kedah ahead before and injury time goal by Asri Mardzuki seal an important victory for Nidzam Adzha's boys. The Red Eagles are now the closest challenger to Johor Darul Ta'zim, sitting on nine points behind the league leaders.

On 15 July 2017, Second-placed Kedah were held to a 1–1 draw at home by Selangor, thanks to some amazing goalkeeping by the Red Giants' Norazlan Razali. Ken Ilsø scored a goal for Kedah.

On 18 July 2017, Morgaro Gomis and Abou Bakr Al-Mel were the toast of the Kelantan after they defeated Kedah 3–1 at Sultan Muhammad IV Stadium in Kota Bharu. Liridon late penalty goal was nothing more than a consolation for the away side.

On 22 July 2017, Second-placed Kedah returned to winning ways, cruising to a comfortable 2–0 win over bottom-placed Penang in the Northern Derby at the State Stadium. The goals were scored by Ken Ilsø (62') and Baddrol (74').

On 26 July 2017, Kedah avenged their 3–1 Malaysia Cup group stage defeat to Kelantan last week, when they hammered the Red Warriors 5–0 at home. They needed only eight minutes to open the scoring, a goal by Syazwan Zainon, but had to wait until the 48th minute for their second through Danish poacher Ken Ilsø, who found the back net once again 12 minutes later. Sandro too scored a brace, in the 71st and 87th minute.

On 29 July 2017, Melaka United went down to their second defeat in the group stage after they shipped six goal to Kedah in a 2–6 loss. Fakri, Sandro (2), Akram and Ken Ilsø all scored for Kedah while Azinee Taib and Fauzi Roslan scored for the home side. However, Akhyar Rashid will grab all the headlines after he notched his first ever goal for Kedah in the rout. The nippy forward is continuing his progress after an encouraging period with the Malaysia national under-22 side.

August
On 1 August 2017, Kedah recording a slim 1–0 win over UiTM FC in Alor Setar. The only goal of the match was scored by Danish forward Ken Ilsø, who pounced on a deflection to score in the 25th minute.

On 5 August 2017, Kedah lost their second away game with a 2–1 loss against Pahang in Super League, despite an equalizer by Syafiq.

September
On 9 September 2017, Kedah took the match against Kelantan seriously to triumphed 2–0 at Darul Aman Stadium. Ken Ilsø continuing his fine form with another goal to add to an earlier strike from Sandro as The Red Eagles won the group with consummate ease.

On 15 September 2017, Kedah recorded a 3–2 win over 2015 champions and 2016 runners up Selangor in their first leg Malaysia Cup quarter-final match at the Selayang Stadium. Ken Ilsø put two goals ahead within the first 15 minutes, but Selangor forward Rufino pulled one back for the hosts after the start of the second half. Syazwan Zainon restored Kedah's two-goal lead, but Rufino doubled his tally just a minute later to give the Red Giants a slim chance of overturning the tie in the second leg.

Kit
Supplier: AL Sports / Sponsor: Bina Darulaman Berhad, Perbadanan Kemajuan Negeri Kedah (Kedah State Development Corporation), Syarikat Air Darul Aman (SADA), Cosmic Express

Players

Squad information 

Last update: 9 September 2017Source: Facebook Kedah FAOrdered by squad number.

Transfers

In

Out

Technical staff

Friendly matches

Pre-season

Current season

Competitions

Overall

Overview

Super League 
The league kick-off on 20 January and ends on 21 October 2017.

League table

Results summary

Results by round

Fixtures and results

First leg

Second leg

FA Cup 
The tournament kick-off on 5 February and ends on 20 May 2017.

Results summary

Knockout phase

Round of 32

Round of 16

Quarter-finals

Semi-finals

Final

Malaysia Cup 
The tournament will kick-off on 4 July 2017 and ends on 4 November 2017.

Results summary

Group stage

Knockout phase

Quarter-finals

Semi-finals

Final

Statistics

Squad statistics 
As of matches played on 4 November 2017.

Goalscorers 
As of matches played on 28 October 2017.

Clean sheets
As of matches played on 28 October 2017.

Disciplinary record

Suspensions 
A player is automatically suspended for the next match for the following offences:
 Receiving a red card (red card suspensions may be extended for serious offences)
 Receiving two yellow cards in two different matches (FA Cup, Malaysia Cup knockout phase)
 Receiving three yellow cards in three different matches (Super League, Malaysia Cup group stage)

As of matches played on 5 August 2017.

Summary

As of matches played on 4 November 2017.

Home attendance

Matches (all competitions)
All matches played at Darul Aman Stadium.

Attendance (each competitions)

Awards

Monthly awards
For the 2017 season, sponsors collaboration with Kedah FA in recognizing the contributions of players throughout the season.
Every month, one player will be selected as the player of the month based on the current performance.
Selection is based on the feedback of squad management and fans. Winners will be announced at 8:00 pm at Darul Aman Stadium.
The winner will win a plaque, a cash prize of RM500, sporting goods, product vouchers and exclusive poster from the sponsors.

Winners are listed first, highlighted in boldface, and indicated with a double dagger.

References

External links

Kedah Darul Aman F.C.
Kedah Darul Aman F.C. seasons
Malaysian football clubs 2017 season